Dennis Petersson (born 14 December 1994) is a Swedish footballer who most recently played for Trelleborgs FF.

Career

Trelleborgs FF
Petersson left Trelleborgs FF at the end of 2018.

References

External links
Dennis Petersson at Fotbolltransfers

Swedish footballers
Allsvenskan players
1994 births
Living people
Trelleborgs FF players
Association football goalkeepers